Lajan District is in Piranshahr County, West Azerbaijan province, Iran. At the 2006 National Census, its population was 22,757 in 3,960 households. The following census in 2011 counted 24,434 people in 5,362 households. At the latest census in 2016, the district had 23,664 inhabitants in 5,667 households.

References 

Piranshahr County

Districts of West Azerbaijan Province

Populated places in West Azerbaijan Province

Populated places in Piranshahr County